Vendetta is a German thrash metal group from Schweinfurt. Founded in 1984, the band dissolved in 1990 and re-activated in 2002. Vendetta's contemporaries include bands such as Exumer and Paradox. Vendetta's signature songs include "Brain Damage", "War", "Precious Existence", and "Conversation". In 2007 the German thrashers released their third album, "Hate", which is the first with the most recent lineup changes since 2002. Vendetta's bassist Klaus "Heiner" Ullrich is currently the only original member present since the band's formation in 1984. The band's lyrical content is connected with everyday topics, such as corruption, politics, violence, and death.

Discography

Studio albums 
 1987 – Go and Live... Stay and Die
 1988 – Brain Damage
 2007 – Hate
 2011 – Feed the Extermination
 2017 – The 5th

Demos 
 1985 – System of Death
 1986 – Suicidal Lunacy
 2003 – Demo 2003

Compilations and video 
 1988 – A Cautionary Tale / And the Brave Man Fails, split album with Sabbat
 1988 – Doomsday News, Various Artists
 1989 – Doomsday News II, Various Artists
 1990 – Doomsday News – The Video Compilation Volume 2, Various Artists (video)
 2003 – Power of Metal – 20 Years in Noise, Various Artists

Band members 

Current members
 Mario Vogel – vocal (2002–present)
 Thomas "Lubber" Krämer – drums (2001–present)
 Klaus "Heiner" Ullrich – bass (1984–1990, 2002–present)
 Frank Heller – guitars (2002–2006, 2012–present)
 Michael "Opf" Opfermann – guitars (2012–present)

Former members
 Andreas "Samson" Samonil – drums (1984–1990)
 Achim Hömerlein "Daxx" – vocals, guitars (1984–1990, 2002–2005)
 Michael "Micky" Wehner – vocals, guitars (lead) (1984–1990)
 Mario Hahn – guitars (2009–2011)

References

External links 
 Official page of Vendetta
 
 

German thrash metal musical groups
Musical groups established in 1984
Schweinfurt
Massacre Records artists
Noise Records artists